Piet van der Schans (23 June 1934 – 23 April 2003) was a Dutch equestrian. He competed in two events at the 1972 Summer Olympics.

References

1934 births
2003 deaths
Dutch male equestrians
Olympic equestrians of the Netherlands
Equestrians at the 1972 Summer Olympics
Sportspeople from North Brabant